António dos Santos Ramalho Eanes, GColL GCL GColTE CavA GCB RVC (born 25 January 1935) is a Portuguese general and politician who was the 16th president of Portugal from 1976 to 1986.

Background
Born at Alcains, Castelo Branco, he is the son of Manuel dos Santos Eanes, a general contractor, and wife Maria do Rosário Ramalho.

Political career
After a long military career in the Portuguese Colonial Wars, he was stationed in Portuguese Angola when the 25 April revolution of 1974 took place. He joined the Movimento das Forças Armadas (MFA or Armed Forces Movement) and after returning to Portugal, he was made president of RTP (Portuguese public television). He ordered the military operations against the pro-communist radical faction of the MFA on 25 November 1975, an event known as the 25 de Novembro, ending that year's "hot summer" (Verão quente).

In 1976 he was elected President of Portugal.  At the end of 1980 he was re-elected, serving until February 1986. After his presidency, he headed the Democratic Renewal Party, and continued to support Social Democratic Party (PSD) minority government until 1987. He resigned in 1987 after defeated by PSD in legislative election.

He is also a Member of the Portuguese Council of State, as a former elected President of Portugal.

He rejected any suggestion of becoming a Marshal, considering the title unnecessary.

Decorations

National:

 Grand Collar of the Order of Liberty (18/12/2015)
 Grand Cross of the Order of Liberty (25/04/2004)
 Grand Collar of the Order of the Tower and Sword (09/03/1986)
 Knight of the Order of Aviz (19/01/1972)

Foreign:

 Royal Victorian Chain

Family
He married at the Palace of Queluz on 28 October 1970 to Maria Manuela Duarte Neto de Portugal Ramalho Eanes (b. 29 December 1938), who was one of Portugal's most politically active First Ladies, making speeches at Democratic Renewal Party rallies while her husband was president. They had two sons, Manuel António (b. 5 May 1972) and Miguel (b. 1977).

Electoral results

1976 Portuguese presidential election

|-
!style="background-color:#E9E9E9" align=left colspan="2" rowspan="2"|Candidates 
!style="background-color:#E9E9E9" align=left rowspan="2"|Supporting parties 	
!style="background-color:#E9E9E9" align=right colspan="2"|First round
|-
!style="background-color:#E9E9E9" align=right|Votes
!style="background-color:#E9E9E9" align=right|%
|-
|style="width: 9px" bgcolor=gray align="center" | 
|align=left|António Ramalho Eanes 
|align=left|Independent
|align="right" |2,967,137
|align="right" |61.59
|-
|style="width: 8px" bgcolor=gray align="center" |
|align=left|Otelo Saraiva de Carvalho
|align=left|Independent
|align="right" |692,147
|align="right" |14.37
|-
|style="width: 8px" bgcolor=gray align="center" | 
|align=left|José Pinheiro de Azevedo
|align=left|Independent
|align="right" |593,021
|align="right" |14.07
|-
|style="width: 8px" bgcolor=red align="center" | 
|align=left|Octávio Rodrigues Pato
|align=left|Portuguese Communist Party
|align="right" |365,586
|align="right" |7.59
|-
|colspan="3" align=left style="background-color:#E9E9E9"|Total valid
|width="65" align="right" style="background-color:#E9E9E9"|4,817,630
|width="40" align="right" style="background-color:#E9E9E9"|100.00
|-
|align=right colspan="3"|Blank ballots
|width="65" align="right" |43,242
|width="40" align="right" |0.89
|-
|align=right colspan="3" |Invalid ballots
|width="65" align="right"|20,253
|width="40" align="right"|0.41
|-
|colspan="3" align=left style="background-color:#E9E9E9"|Total (turnout 75.47%)
|width="65" align="right" style="background-color:#E9E9E9"|4,881,125 
|width="40" align="right" style="background-color:#E9E9E9"|
|-
|colspan=5 align=left|Source: Comissão Nacional de Eleições
|}

1980 Portuguese presidential election

|-
!style="background-color:#E9E9E9" align=left colspan="2" rowspan="2"|Candidates 
!style="background-color:#E9E9E9" align=left rowspan="2"|Supporting parties 	
!style="background-color:#E9E9E9" align=right colspan="2"|First round
|-
!style="background-color:#E9E9E9" align=right|Votes
!style="background-color:#E9E9E9" align=right|%
|-
|style="width: 9px" bgcolor=gray align="center" |
|align=left|António Ramalho Eanes
|align=left|Independent
|align="right" |3,262,520
|align="right" |56.44
|-
|style="width: 8px" bgcolor=#00FFFF align="center" | 
|align=left|António Soares Carneiro 
|align=left|Democratic Alliance
|align="right" |2,325,481
|align="right" |40.23
|-
|style="width: 9px" bgcolor=gray align="center" |
|align=left|Otelo Saraiva de Carvalho
|align=left|Independent
|align="right" |85,896
|align="right" |1.49
|-
|style="width: 9px" bgcolor=gray align="center" |
|align=left|Carlos Galvão de Melo
|align=left|Independent
|align="right" |48,468
|align="right" |0.84
|-
|style="width: 9px" bgcolor=gray align="center" |
|align=left|António Pires Veloso
|align=left|Independent
|align="right" |45,132
|align="right" |0.78
|-
|style="width: 9px" bgcolor=red align="center" |
|align=left|António Aires Rodrigues
|align=left|Workers Party of Socialist Unity
|align="right" |12,745
|align="right" |0.22
|-
|style="width: 9px" bgcolor=red align="center" |
|align=left|Carlos Brito
|align=left|Portuguese Communist Party
|colspan="2" align="center" |left the race
|-
|colspan="3" align=left style="background-color:#E9E9E9"|Total valid
|width="65" align="right" style="background-color:#E9E9E9"|5,780,242
|width="40" align="right" style="background-color:#E9E9E9"|100.00
|-
|align=right colspan="3"|Blank ballots
|width="65" align="right" |44,014
|width="40" align="right" |0.75
|-
|align=right colspan="3" |Invalid ballots
|width="65" align="right"|16,076
|width="40" align="right"|0.28
|-
|colspan="3" align=left style="background-color:#E9E9E9"|Total (turnout 84.39%)
|width="65" align="right" style="background-color:#E9E9E9"|5,840,332   
|width="40" align="right" style="background-color:#E9E9E9"|
|-
| colspan=5 align=left|He left the race in favor of Ramalho Eanes.
|-
|colspan=5 align=left|Source: Comissão Nacional de Eleições
|}

Notes

External links
Biography in Portuguese

1935 births
Living people
People from Castelo Branco, Portugal
Portuguese military officers
Presidents of Portugal
Democratic Renewal Party (Portugal) politicians

Grand Crosses of the Order of Aviz
Grand Crosses of the Order of Liberty
Collars of the Order of Isabella the Catholic
 
Honorary Knights Grand Cross of the Order of the Bath
Recipients of the Order of the Tower and Sword
Recipients of the Order of Timor-Leste
20th-century Portuguese politicians
Grand Crosses Special Class of the Order of Merit of the Federal Republic of Germany